Vitaly Nikitich Ignatenko (born 19 April 1941) is a Russian journalist and politician who had been the head of ITAR-TASS news agency from 1993 until 2012 and had served in the cabinet of Prime Minister Viktor Chernomyrdin from 1995 to 1997 as deputy prime minister. He has also been a member of different journalism organizations and foundations promoting the Russian language and Russian-speaking press.

Biography
Graduating from Moscow State University with a degree in journalism, he worked for the Komsomolskaya Pravda and Novoye Vremya newspapers in the 1980s. From 1990 to 1991 he served as the press secretary of Soviet President Mikhail Gorbachev.

On June 2, 1995, Ignatenko was appointed Deputy Chairman of Government of the Russian Federation for media affairs. He worked in coordination with fellow deputy chairman Sergei Shakhrai. In 1997, during the Tajikistani Civil War, he was in contact with a local warlord to organize the release of foreign hostages.

In September 2012 Ignatenko was replaced as head of ITAR-TASS news agency.

He is also a UNESCO Goodwill Ambassador and President of the World Association of Russian Press.

Sources

References

Books
 

1941 births
Living people
Russian journalists
20th-century Russian politicians
Deputy heads of government of the Russian Federation
Moscow State University alumni
People from Sochi
Members of the Federation Council of Russia (after 2000)
Full Cavaliers of the Order "For Merit to the Fatherland"